Masters of Horror is an anthology television series created by director Mick Garris for the Showtime cable network.

Origin
In 2002, director Mick Garris invited some director friends to an informal dinner at a restaurant in Sherman Oaks, California. The original ten "masters" attending were John Carpenter, Larry Cohen, Don Coscarelli, Joe Dante, Guillermo del Toro, Stuart Gordon, Tobe Hooper, John Landis, Bill Malone, and Garris himself.

Subsequently, Garris organized regular dinners with the group and invited other horror and other genre directors to attend, including Dario Argento, Eli Roth, Wes Craven, David Cronenberg, Tim Sullivan, Rob Zombie, Bryan Singer, Fred Dekker, William Lustig, Lucky McKee, Ernest Dickerson, Katt Shea, Quentin Tarantino, Robert Rodriguez, James Gunn, Mary Lambert, Tom Holland, Peter Medak, Ti West, Lloyd Kaufman, and others. In 2005, Garris created and produced an original anthology television series of one-hour movies, written and directed by many of the "masters," which was originally broadcast in the U.S. on the Showtime cable network. In several international territories, the films were released theatrically.

The series debuted to excellent reviews in the U.S. on October 28, 2005, with the premiere episode "Incident On and Off a Mountain Road," co-written and directed by Don Coscarelli, based on the short story by Joe R. Lansdale. New episodes premiered every Friday at 10 p.m. EST throughout the series' two seasons. The show followed an anthology series format, with each episode featuring a one-hour film directed by a well-known horror film director. In 2009, Chiller began airing the show on their Sunday evening line-up of shows, and in 2010, Reelz Channel began airing episodes of Masters of Horror edited (despite keeping its TV-MA rating) and with commercials.

Series overview

Episodes

Season 1 (2005–06)

Episode 4, "Jenifer", was accidentally made available on-demand to a select audience at the same time as episode 2, "H. P. Lovecraft's Dreams in the Witch-House". The episode was cut for graphic violence during its initial television broadcast, and the cut scenes can only be viewed in a featurette separate from the film on the R1 DVD release.

Episode 13, "Imprint", originally scheduled to premiere on January 27, 2006, was shelved by Showtime due to concerns over its content.  Mick Garris, creator and executive producer of the series, characterized the episode as "the most disturbing film I've ever seen". It is available only on DVD and Blu-ray by Anchor Bay Entertainment, along with the rest of the episodes in the first season. "Imprint" was shown in the UK on Bravo (7 April 2006).

Season 2 (2006–07)

Related series

Fear Itself

Series creator Mick Garris stated that Showtime opted not to show the third season and that film studio Lionsgate had begun funding the series. The Hollywood Reporter reported on September 25, 2007, that Mick Garris and Lionsgate signed a 13-episode deal with NBC. Instead of a third season of the show, a new show, Fear Itself, was created with the same premise as Masters of Horror. It premiered on NBC in Summer 2008.

Soundtrack

A two-disc soundtrack was released for the series in October 2005 on Immortal Records. The album features heavy metal and hard rock acts with a few acoustic pieces. A second volume was released a year later.

Comic adaptations
IDW Publishing produced a series of comic book adaptations of several episodes from the series. The first four issues are two-parters, adapting "Incident On and Off a Mountain Road", based on the short story by Joe R. Lansdale, and "Dreams in the Witch-House". The first two comic covers were painted by the award-winning artist Jeremy Caniglia.

Awards and nominations

References

External links
 
 Official website (requires Adobe Flash) archived at the Wayback Machine

2000s American anthology television series
2000s American horror television series
2005 American television series debuts
2007 American television series endings
2000s Canadian anthology television series
2005 Canadian television series debuts
2007 Canadian television series endings
Showtime (TV network) original programming
Television shows filmed in Vancouver
English-language television shows
American horror fiction television series
Canadian horror fiction television series
Television series by Lionsgate Television
Horror anthologies
Saturn Award-winning television series